Jamal Damja (born 1966) is a Libyan football coach.

Libya
Damja was assigned the Libya head coach role in October 2016 after previous manager Javier Clemente led the Mediterranean Knights to a dispiriting loss against DR Congo, the penultimate 2018 world cup qualifier they played that year. Taking charge a week before Libya's last qualifier facing Tunisia, he lost his first match at the national team's helm 1-0, placing them at the bottom of their group. Responding to their run of results, Damja blamed the fact that all of their fixtures were not staged in Libya due to the dissension that has beset the country for decades so they would never have home advantage. His contracted expired in November 2017 and he was replaced by assistant Amer Almalmi.

He was reappointed in 2019 following Libya's failure to qualify for the 2019 Africa Cup of Nations. Later on, he resigned on 24 October 2019.

References

Living people
Libya national football team managers
Libyan football managers
1966 births